Swedish Schnapps (The Genius of Charlie Parker, volume 8) (MG V-8010) is a Charlie Parker compilation album, released by Verve Records, compiling recordings made by two different groups, on two different dates in 1951. The tracks had previously been released as 78rpm singles, and the master takes had previously appeared on the 1955 Clef Records LP The Magnificent Charlie Parker (MG C-646).

The two sessions feature either Max Roach or Kenny Clarke on drums. The January 17, 1951 session features Miles Davis on trumpet, who had made many recordings as part of Parker's band in 1946 and 1947. This recording session was the same day as Davis' own first recording session for his new label, Prestige Records, which he would complete later the same day.

Track listing

Performers
tracks 1-6, 13
August 8, 1951
Charlie Parker - alto saxophone
Red Rodney - trumpet
John Lewis - piano
Ray Brown - acoustic bass
Kenny Clarke - drums

tracks 7-12
January 17, 1951
Charlie Parker - alto saxophone
Miles Davis - trumpet
Walter Bishop Jr. - piano
Teddy Kotick - acoustic bass
Max Roach - drums & percussion

References / Notes

1951 albums
Charlie Parker albums